In continuum mechanics, objective stress rates are time derivatives of stress that do not depend on the frame of reference.  Many constitutive equations are designed in the form of a relation between a stress-rate and a strain-rate (or the rate of deformation tensor).  The mechanical response of a material should not depend on the frame of reference.  In other words, material constitutive equations should be frame-indifferent (objective).  If the stress and strain measures are material quantities then objectivity is automatically satisfied.  However, if the quantities are spatial, then the objectivity of the stress-rate is not guaranteed even if the strain-rate is objective.

There are numerous objective stress rates in continuum mechanics – all of which can be shown to be special forms of Lie derivatives. Some of the widely used objective stress rates are:
 the  Truesdell rate of the Cauchy stress tensor,
 the  Green–Naghdi rate of the Cauchy stress, and
 the  Zaremba-Jaumann rate of the Cauchy stress. 

The adjacent figure shows the performance of various objective rates in a simple shear test where the material model is hypoelastic with constant elastic moduli.  The ratio of the shear stress to the displacement is plotted as a function of time.  The same moduli are used with the three objective stress rates.  Clearly there are spurious oscillations observed for the Zaremba-Jaumann stress rate.
This is not because one rate is better than another but because it is a misuse of material models to use the same constants with different objective rates. For this reason, a recent trend has been to avoid objective stress rates altogether where possible.

Non-objectivity of the time derivative of Cauchy stress 
Under rigid body rotations, the Cauchy stress tensor  transforms as

Since  is a spatial quantity and the transformation follows the rules of tensor transformations,  is objective.  However,

Therefore, the stress rate is  not objective unless the rate of rotation is zero, i.e.  is constant.

For a physical understanding of the above, consider the situation shown in Figure 1. In the figure the components of the Cauchy (or true) stress tensor are denoted by the symbols . This tensor, which describes the forces on a small material element imagined to be cut out from the material as currently deformed, is not objective at large deformations because it varies with rigid body rotations of the material. The material points must be characterized by their initial Lagrangian coordinates . Consequently, it is necessary to introduce the so-called objective stress rate , or the corresponding increment . It means that  must be invariant with respect to coordinate transformations, particularly the rigid-body rotations, and must characterize the state of the same material element as it deforms.

The objective stress rate can be derived in two ways:
 by tensorial coordinate transformations, which is the standard way in finite element textbooks
 variationally, from strain energy density in the material expressed in terms of the strain tensor (which is objective by definition)

While the former way is instructive and provides useful geometric insight, the latter way is mathematically shorter and has the additional advantage of automatically ensuring energy conservation, i.e., guaranteeing that the second-order work of the stress increment tensor on the strain increment tensor be correct (work conjugacy requirement).

Truesdell stress rate of the Cauchy stress
The relation between the Cauchy stress and the 2nd P-K stress is called
the  Piola transformation.  This transformation can be 

The  Truesdell rate of the Cauchy stress is the Piola transformation of the material time derivative of the 2nd P-K stress.  We thus define

Expanded out, this means that

where the Kirchhoff stress  and the  Lie derivative of 
the Kirchhoff stress is

This expression can be simplified to the well known expression for the Truesdell rate of the Cauchy stress

It can be shown that the Truesdell rate is objective.

Truesdell rate of the Kirchhoff stress 
The Truesdell rate of the Kirchhoff stress can be obtained by noting that

and defining

Expanded out, this means that

Following the same process as for the Cauchy stress above, we can show that

Green-Naghdi rate of the Cauchy stress 
This is a special form of the Lie derivative (or the Truesdell rate of the Cauchy stress).  Recall that the Truesdell rate of the Cauchy stress is given by

From the polar decomposition theorem we have

where  is the orthogonal rotation tensor

If we assume that  we get .  Also since there is no
stretch  and we have .  Note that this doesn't mean 
that there is not stretch in the actual body - this simplification is just
for the purposes of defining an objective stress rate.  Therefore,

We can show that this expression can be simplified to the
commonly used form of the  Green-Naghdi rate

The Green–Naghdi rate of the Kirchhoff stress also has the form since the stretch is not taken into consideration, i.e.,

Zaremba-Jaumann rate of the Cauchy stress 
The Zaremba-Jaumann rate of the Cauchy stress is a further specialization of the
Lie derivative (Truesdell rate).  This rate has the form

The Zaremba-Jaumann rate is used widely in computations primarily for two reasons
it is relatively easy to implement.
it leads to symmetric tangent moduli.

Recall that the spin tensor  (the skew part of the velocity gradient)
can be expressed as

Thus for pure rigid body motion

Alternatively, we can consider the case of  proportional loading when the principal directions of strain remain constant.  An example of this situation is the axial loading of a cylindrical bar.  In that situation, since

we have

Also,

of the Cauchy stress.
Therefore,

This once again gives

In general, if we approximate

the Green–Naghdi rate becomes the Zaremba-Jaumann rate of the Cauchy stress

Other objective stress rates 
There can be an infinite variety of objective stress rates.  One of these
is the  Oldroyd stress rate

In simpler form, the Oldroyd rate is given by

If the current configuration is assumed to be the reference configuration then the pull back and push forward operations can be conducted using  and  respectively.  The Lie derivative of the Cauchy stress is then called the  convective stress rate

In simpler form, the convective rate is given by

Objective stress rates in finite strain inelasticity 
Many materials undergo inelastic deformations caused by plasticity and damage.  These material behaviors cannot be described in terms of a potential.  It is also often the case that no memory of the initial virgin state exists, particularly when large deformations are involved.  The constitutive relation is typically defined in incremental form in such cases to make the computation of stresses and deformations easier.

The incremental loading procedure 
For a small enough load step, the material deformation can be characterized by the small (or linearized) strain increment tensor  
 
where  is the displacement increment of the continuum points. The time derivative 
 
For finite strains, measures from the Seth–Hill family (also called Doyle–Ericksen tensors) can be used:

where  is the right stretch.  A second-order approximation of these tensors is

Energy-consistent objective stress rates 
Consider a material element of unit initial volume, starting from an initial state under initial Cauchy (or true) stress  and let  be the Cauchy stress in the final configuration. Let  be the work done (per unit initial volume) by the internal forces during an incremental deformation from this initial state.  Then the variation  corresponds to the variation in the work done due to a variation in the displacement .  The displacement variation has to satisfy the displacement boundary conditions.

Let  be an objective stress tensor in the initial configuration.

Variation of work done 
Then the variation in work done can be expressed as

where the finite strain measure  is energy conjugate to the stress measure .  Expanded out, 

From the symmetry of the Cauchy stress, we have 

For small variations in strain, using the approximation

and the expansions

we get the equation

Imposing the variational condition that the resulting equation must be valid for any strain gradient , we have 

We can also write the above equation as

Time derivatives 
The Cauchy stress and the first Piola-Kirchhoff stress are related by (see Stress measures)

For small incremental deformations, 

Therefore,

Substituting ,

For small increments of stress  relative to the initial stress , the above reduces to

From equations (1) and (3) we have

Recall that  is an increment of the stress tensor measure .
Defining the stress rate

and noting that

we can write equation (4) as

Here  = material rate of Cauchy stress (i.e., the rate in Lagrangian coordinates of the initial stressed state).

Work-conjugate stress rates 
A rate for which there exists no legitimate finite strain tensor  associated according to Eq. (6) is energetically inconsistent, i.e., its use violates energy balance (i.e., the first law of thermodynamics).

Evaluating Eq.

where  is the objective stress rate associated with the Green-Lagrangian strain.

In particular,
  gives the Truesdell stress rate
  gives the Zaremba-Jaumann rate of Kirchhoff stress
  gives the Biot stress rate

(Note that m = 2 leads to Engesser's formula for critical load in shear buckling, while m = -2 leads to Haringx's formula which can give critical loads differing by >100%).

Non work-conjugate stress rates 
Other rates, used in most commercial codes, which are not work-conjugate to any finite strain tensor are:
 the Zaremba-Jaumann, or corotational, rate of Cauchy stress: It differs from Zaremba-Jaumann rate of Kirchhoff stress by missing the rate of relative volume change of material. The lack of work-conjugacy is usually not a serious problem since that term is negligibly small for many materials and zero for incompressible materials (but in indentation of a sandwich plate with foam core, this rate can give an error of >30% in the indentation force).
 the Cotter–Rivlin rate corresponds to  but it again misses the volumetric term.
 the Green–Naghdi rate: This objective stress rate is not work-conjugate to any finite strain tensor, not only because of the missing volumetric term but also because the material rotation velocity is not exactly equal to the spin tensor. In the vast majority of applications, the errors in the energy calculation, caused by these differences, are negligible. However, it must be pointed out that a large energy error was already demonstrated for a case with shear strains and rotations exceeding about 0.25.
 the Oldroyd rate.

Objective rates and Lie derivatives 
The objective stress rates could also be regarded as the Lie derivatives of various types of stress tensor (i.e., the associated covariant, contravariant and mixed components of Cauchy stress) and their linear combinations. The Lie derivative does not include the concept of work-conjugacy.

Tangential stiffness moduli and their transformations to achieve energy consistency 
The tangential stress-strain relation has generally the form

where  are the tangential moduli (components of a 4th-order tensor) associated with strain tensor .

From the fact that Eq. (7) must hold true for any velocity gradient , it follows that:

where  are the tangential moduli associated with the Green–Lagrangian strain, taken as a reference,  = current Cauchy stress, and  = Kronecker delta (or unit tensor).

Eq. (8) can be used to convert one objective stress rate to another. Since , the transformation

Large strain often develops when the material behavior becomes nonlinear, due to plasticity or damage. Then the primary cause of stress dependence of the tangential moduli is the physical behavior of material. What Eq. Yet none of them is fundamentally preferable, except if there exists one stress rate, one , for which the moduli can be considered constant.

See also 
 Cauchy stress tensor
 Stress measures
 Principle of material objectivity
 Hypoelastic material

External links
Objectivity in Classical Mechanics

References 

Continuum mechanics